Main Sunder Hoon is a 1971 Indian Hindi-language drama film directed by R. Krishnan and Nazir Hussain. The film stars Mehmood and Leena Chandavarkar. It is a remake of the 1964 Tamil film Server Sundaram.

Plot
Sunder works in a hotel owned by Ram Swarup as a waiter. He is a very funny, uneducated man, with a suitably funny face, in contrast to his name. Radha is the daughter of Ram Swarup. She often comes to the hotel, and Sunder happens to meet her and amuse her with funny jokes. One day, in a casual remark, she says: "I like your innocence". He does not understand the word "innocence", and thinks that she likes him. He also likes her, but is afraid to tell her, as he works in her father's hotel.

Then, he seeks help from his friend, Amar. He helps him find work in the film industry. And in no time, Sunder emerges as a leading comic actor. But at this time, Amar, ignorant about his friend's love, and Radha fall in love. When he knows that Sunder's love is Radha, he asks Radha, who says that she never loved Sunder. Amar stops Sunder multiple times from expressing his feelings to Radha, thinking that the truth will break Sunder down.

During his stardom days, he once performs at a charity show for orphaned children. He becomes emotional seeing the children, and decides to stay a day longer, and in the process, misses his father's death ceremony at his home. His mother asks him to be with her in her last moments, and he promises to.
 
One day, during an interview to the All India Radio, he says that he likes to have his old waiter uniform in front of him, so that it could remind him of what he was earlier, so that he would not develop any pride. And in the same interview, he says that he is going to marry someone he loves. Amar and Radha listen to this on the radio. Knowing that Sunder will come to express his love for her, Radha urges Amar to tell him the truth, but he says, he is unable to do so. Sunder comes, and Radha tells him the truth. Heartbroken, Sunder wishes well for his friend, and Radha.

Then, one day, he goes for the shooting of the climax of a film, whose date of release has come very near. The producer says to his guard that nobody, under any circumstance should disturb them. And back home, his mother falls down the stairs. She is rushed to the hospital. She wants to see her son, so, a man is sent to call him, but the guard does not allow him in. Instead, he himself goes to get some good medication. Sunder, after finishing the work, learns about the accident, and rushes away. But he finds her dead. He regrets being a celebrity.

Amar and Radha marry. At that ceremony, Sunder comes in his old uniform, of a waiter. He says, he will no longer work in films, as that life is unreal. He will meet with his mother from now on, by helping poor and orphaned children.

Cast

Mehmood as Sunder 
Biswajeet as Amar 
Leena Chandavarkar as Radha 
Sulochana Latkar as Sundar's mother (as Sulochana) 
Aruna Irani as Miss Pasha (film actress) 
Rajendra Nath as Director
Shabnam   
David Abraham as Ram Swarup (Rasraj Hotel owner) 
Mukri as Dattaram 
Ashim Kumar as Chandrakant Mehta (film producer) 
S.L. Narayan   
C.S. Dubey as Chicken owner (as Dubey)
Jayshree T. as herself (in the song "Nach Meri Jaan")
 Shahu Modak as Lord Shiva in the parody song
 Sulochana Chatterjee as Devi Paravti in the parody song

Production 
Main Sunder Hoon is a remake of the Tamil film Server Sundaram (1964).

Songs
"Mujhko Thand Lag Rahi Hai" - Asha Bhosle, Kishore Kumar
"Naach Meri Jaan" - Asha Bhosle, Kishore Kumar
"Tujhe Dil Ki Baat Bata Du, Nahi Nahi Nahi" - Lata Mangeshkar
"Aaj Mai Javan Ho Gai Hu" - Lata Mangeshkar
"Kurukoo, Do Mastane Do Deewane, Ek Mai Hu Ek Tu Kuruku Kuruku" - Asha Bhosle, Kishore Kumar
"Parivar Niyojan (Parody)" - Shahu Modak, Aruna Irani, Mehmood, Manna Dey, Mukesh, Asha Bhosle
"Khamosh Ye Aasmaan Hai Ye Kaun Hai, Ye Kaun Hai, Jo Besahara Hai" - Mukesh, Asha Bhosle, Manna Dey

Trivia 
The picnic song 'Tuze dil ki baat bata du' with Leena Chandavarkar and her friends is shot in Mahabalipuram, now a world heritage site.

In the song 'Nach meri jaan' Kishor Kumar, Music director  Jaikishan a d lyricist Anand Bakshi appear as themselves.

In many scenes actors Rajendra nath, Aruna Irani, Nasir Hussain, Waheeda Rehman, Ramesh Deo appear in cameo roles.

In the award ceremony scene, Mehmood says the famous funny words "Ladies and Ledas" instead of "Ladies and gentlemen" ... this became quite popular in many informal events later.

References

External links
 

1971 films
1970s Hindi-language films
1971 drama films
Films scored by Shankar–Jaikishan
Hindi remakes of Tamil films
Films with screenplays by K. Balachander
Films directed by Krishnan–Panju